The Wrecker is a 1929 British-German silent crime film directed by Géza von Bolváry and starring Carlyle Blackwell, Joseph Striker, and Benita Hume. The film was based on the play of the same title by Arnold Ridley. It was produced by Michael Balcon for Gainsborough Pictures in a co-production with the German firm Felsom Film.

Plot
A criminal referred to by the press as "The Wrecker" is orchestrating accidents on Britain's railways. One such accident occurs on the (fictional) United Coast Lines Railway, whose train is carrying Roger Doyle (Joseph Striker), who has retired from cricket to work on the railway. Roger survives, and reports the accident to his uncle, Sir Gerald Bartlett (Winter Hall), the managing director of the railway, and his assistant, the sly Ambrose Barney (Carlyle Blackwell). Unbeknownst to them, Ambrose is The Wrecker, and is also the head of the Kyle Motor-Coach Company, whose buses are introduced on services where The Wrecker has struck, hoping to frighten passengers off of the trains and onto buses. When Sir Gerald becomes suspicious of Ambrose following yet another accident, he is shot dead.

After receiving a tip-off from one of Ambrose's employees, Roger and bumbling detective Ramesses Ratchett (Leonard Thompson) foil another planned accident, much to the delight of the press. Ambrose, enraged at being foiled, plans another accident, but his conversation is recorded onto a wax cylinder by Roger and his girlfriend, Mary Shelton (Benita Hume), Sir Gerald's secretary who had been on the train that Roger had saved from disaster. On hearing the wax cylinder that exposes his crimes, Ambrose shoots the phonograph, destroying the cylinder, and flees from Roger and Mary, only to find himself on the very train that is to be wrecked. Ambrose holds Roger at gunpoint, but is attacked from behind by Mary and subdued, and the train is brought to a safe halt. With Ambrose defeated, Roger and Mary profess their love for each other, disappearing in a cloud of steam as the train reverses away.

Cast

Production
The film was shot as a silent, with a soundtrack was later added. The crash scene was filmed at Herriard on the Basingstoke and Alton Light Railway. A set of SECR coaches and a SECR F1 Class locomotive No. A148 were released on an incline to collide into a Foden steam lorry. The impact, which destroyed the locomotive and the lorry, was recorded by 22 cameras and has been described as "the most spectacular rail crash in cinema history."

Restoration
The film has been restored, with a new musical score by the composer Neil Brand. On 26 November 2009 it was launched at a special screening at the Watercress Line, a heritage railway close to where the filming took place. The film was released on DVD in the UK on 16 November 2009.

References

Bibliography

External links

Alton line's silent movie stunt – BBC News article

1929 crime films
British crime films
German crime films
Films of the Weimar Republic
British silent feature films
German silent feature films
German films based on plays
British films based on plays
Rail transport films
Films directed by Géza von Bolváry
Films set in England
Gainsborough Pictures films
Films produced by Arnold Pressburger
German black-and-white films
British black-and-white films
1920s British films
1920s German films
Silent crime films